American Democracy Television (ADTV) provides nonpartisan programming about representative democracy to Public, educational, and government access (PEG) cable TV channels across the United States.

General
ADTV programming is produced by The Alliance for Representative Democracy a partnership combining the resources of the National Conference of State Legislatures, Trust for Representative Democracy; the Center for Civic Education and the Center on Congress at Indiana University. The project is funded by the U.S. Department of Education under the Education for Democracy Act approved by the U.S. Congress. ADTV has free programming available to public-access television, educational-access television, government-access television channels nationwide, and currently distributes to nearly 500 cable TV stations.

Selected topics
 How representative democracy works at the local, state and national levels
 That compromise and disagreement are an important part of our system of democracy
 How their ideas and special interests are represented
 Ways to make their voices heard

In its first 2 years, ADTV spread to all 50 states and Washington, DC. The programming currently reaches over 12 million households on a regular basis and continues to educate the public about representative democracy, with its stated goal to challenge cynicism and reinvigorating the public's perception of its government.

Awards
ADTV Flight 4  won the 2005 Gold Marcom Award.

References

ADTV official site
National Conference of State Legislatures official site
Center on Congress official site
Center for Civic Education official site
PSAs on YouTube

American public access television
Television channels and stations established in 2005